Rounder(s) or The Rounder(s) may refer to:

Film and television
 The Rounders (1914 film), a comedy short
 The Rounder (1930 film), a comedy short
 The Rounders (1965 film), a western comedy
 Rounders (film), a 1998 poker film
 The Rounders (TV series), a 1966-67 American series based on the 1965 film

Music
 The Rounders (band), an American rock group
 Rounder Records, a record company
 The Holy Modal Rounders or simply The Rounders, an American folk music duo

Sports and games
 Rounders, a ball game
 Rounder, a poker term
 Rounder, a type of bet offered by UK bookmakers

See also
 The Rounder Girls, a trio who competed in the Eurovision Song Contest 2000